New Freedom is a historic railway station located at New Freedom, York County, Pennsylvania.  It was built about 1870 by the Northern Central Railway, and is a 1 1/2-story, rectangular frame building with a gable roof and overhanging eaves.  The building ceased to be used as a railway station in 1960.

It was added to the National Register of Historic Places in 1995 as the New Freedom Railroad Station, Northern Central Railway.

Gallery

References

Railway stations on the National Register of Historic Places in Pennsylvania
Railway stations in the United States opened in 1870
Transportation buildings and structures in York County, Pennsylvania
Former Pennsylvania Railroad stations
National Register of Historic Places in York County, Pennsylvania
1870 establishments in Pennsylvania
Railway stations closed in 1960